Two Friends is a 1954 Soviet comedy film directed by Viktor Eisymont.

Plot 
The film tells about two friends of Vita and Kostya who are extremely poor at school, preferring football studies. Vitya's mom takes away the ball from him, but this does not stop the boys from finding new entertainments and getting new bad grades.

Starring 
 Lyonya Krauklis as Vitya Maleyev
 Vladimir Guskov as Kostya Shishkin (as Vova Guskov)
 Misha Aronov as Misha
 Vitya Byelov as Khudozhnik stengazety
 Borya Burlyaev as Tolik
 Natasha Zasluyeva as Natasha
 Kseniya Spiridonova as Tosya
 Daniil Sagal as father of Vitya (as D. Sagal)
 Vera Orlova as mother of Vitya (as V. Orlova)
 Ksana Bibina as Lika Maleyeva
 Yanina Zheymo as mother of Kostya
 Irina Zarubina as Olga Nikolayevna (as I. Zarubina)

References

External links 
 

1954 films
1950s Russian-language films
Soviet black-and-white films
Soviet comedy films
1954 comedy films